In the developmental biology of the early twentieth century, a morphogenetic field is a group of cells able to respond to discrete, localized biochemical signals leading to the development of specific morphological structures or organs. The spatial and temporal extents of the embryonic field are dynamic, and within the field is a collection of interacting cells out of which a particular organ is formed. As a group, the cells within a given morphogenetic field are constrained: thus, cells in a limb field will become a limb tissue, those in a cardiac field will become heart tissue. However, specific cellular programming of individual cells in a field is flexible: an individual cell in a cardiac field can be redirected via cell-to-cell signaling to replace specific damaged or missing cells. Imaginal discs in insect larvae are examples of morphogenetic fields.

Historical development 
The concept of the morphogenetic field, fundamental in the early twentieth century to the study of embryological development, was first introduced in 1910 by Alexander G. Gurwitsch. Experimental support was provided by Ross Granville Harrison's experiments transplanting fragments of a newt embryo into different locations.

Harrison was able to identify "fields" of cells producing organs such as limbs, tail and gills and to show that these fields could be fragmented or have undifferentiated cells added and a complete normal final structure would still result. It was thus considered that it was the "field" of cells, rather than individual cells, that were patterned for subsequent development of particular organs. The field concept was developed further by Harrison's friend Hans Spemann, and then by Paul Weiss and others. The concept was similar to the meaning of the term entelechy of vitalists like Hans Adolf Eduard Driesch (1867–1941).

By the 1930s, however, the work of geneticists, especially Thomas Hunt Morgan, revealed the importance of chromosomes and genes for controlling development, and the rise of the new synthesis in evolutionary biology lessened the perceived importance of the field hypothesis. Morgan was a particularly harsh critic of fields since the gene and the field were perceived as competitors for recognition as the basic unit of ontogeny. With the discovery and mapping of master control genes, such as the homeobox genes the pre-eminence of genes seemed assured. But in the late twentieth century the field concept was "rediscovered" as a useful part of developmental biology. It was found, for example, that different mutations could cause the same malformations, suggesting that the mutations were affecting a complex of structures as a unit, a unit that might correspond to the field of early 20th century embryology.

Scott Gilbert proposed that the morphogenetic field is a middle ground between genes and evolution. That is, genes act upon fields, which then act upon the developing organism. Jessica Bolker described morphogenetic fields not merely as incipient structures or organs, but as dynamic entities with their own localized development processes, which are central to the emerging field of Evolutionary developmental biology ("evo-devo"). In 2005, Sean B. Carroll and colleagues mention morphogenetic fields only as a concept proposed by early embryologists to explain the finding that a forelimb bud could be transplanted and still give rise to a forelimb; they define "field" simply as "a discrete region" in an embryo.

References

Further reading

External links
See a morphogenetic field model and simulation at: Lahoz-Beltra, R., Selem Mojica, N., Perales-Gravan, C., Navarro, J., Marijuan, P.C., 2008. Towards a Morphogenetic Field Theory. 

Developmental biology